(Caspar) Ferdinand Stadler (23 February 1813 – 24 March 1870) was a Swiss architect of the generation before Gottfried Semper.  He was born and died in Zurich.

All his buildings are in Switzerland, mainly Zurich, except for the Christ Church, Nazareth and an apartment in Neustadt an der Weinstrasse. His most notable designs include the City Church in Glarus and the Elisabethenkirche in Basel. Ferndinand Stadler also rebuilt the Augustinerkirche at the Münzplatz in Zürich.

References 

1813 births
1870 deaths
19th-century Swiss architects